This is a list of football (soccer) stadiums in Zambia, ranked in descending order of capacity Some stadiums are football-specific and some are used for other purposes. A minimum capacity of 5,000 is required.

Existing stadiams
t

Under Construction Stadiums

Proposed Stadiums

See also 
List of association football stadiums by capacity
List of African stadiums by capacity

References

External links 

 
Zambia
Football in Zambia
Football stadiums